Pedro Pablo Nakada Ludeña (born February 28, 1973) a.k.a. "El Apóstol de la Muerte" ("The Apostle of Death") is a Peruvian serial killer who claimed 25 victims and was convicted of 17 murders. He was sentenced to 35 years in prison.

Early life
Nakada was born Pedro Pablo Mesías Ludeña on February 28, 1973, in Lima, Peru. Nakada's biological father was an alcoholic and his mother had an unspecified mental disorder. As a child, Nakada was submissive and often abused by his siblings. He was devastated when his father died at a young age, as he would defend him from the mockery of his sisters and their friends, who would make Nakada dress like a girl. He also claimed to have been raped by his brothers after they thought that he had killed their pregnant dog. He blamed this incident for his hatred of homosexuals. Nakada claims to have tortured animals as a child.

In 2003, Nakada paid a Japanese citizen 800 Peruvian soles to adopt him as an adult, hoping that this could help him migrate to Japan as a Japanese descendant, and changed his paternal surname from Mesías to the Japanese Nakada accordingly. This tactic is commonly used by Peruvian criminals as a way to flee local justice. Though Nakada never moved to Japan, his younger brother Vayron Jonathan Nakada Ludeña did and was arrested there in 2015, following a three-day killing spree in which he fatally stabbed six people. Nakada's family claims that both brothers are paranoid schizophrenics.

Murders and arrest
Nakada killed his victims with 9mm pistols fitted with his own handmade rubber silencers modified from slippers. His claimed motive was that he had been commanded by God to cleanse the Earth by eliminating drug addicts, prostitutes, homosexuals, and criminals.

Nakada was arrested on December 28, 2006, after a shootout with the police inside his workplace. One officer was injured in the shooting. Though he confessed to have killed 25 people, he was convicted of 17 murders only, and was sentenced to a maximum prison term of 35 years.

Victims
All of Nakada's victims

See also
List of serial killers by country
List of serial killers by number of victims

References

1973 births
21st-century criminals
Adult adoptees
Living people
Male serial killers
People convicted of murder by Peru
People from Lima Province
People with schizophrenia
Peruvian people convicted of murder
Peruvian serial killers
Vigilantes
Violence against gay men